Here's Looking Up Your Address is the debut studio album by Australian rock band Absent Friends. It was released in April 1990 and peaked at number 7 on the ARIA Charts and was certified gold.

Track listing
All songs written by S. Kelly except where noted, according to Australasian Performing Right Association (APRA).

 "Hullabaloo" (S. Kelly, J. Mackay) - 4:17
 "Mean Streak" - 3:40  
 "Sister" - 3:59
 "Hallelujah" (12") - 4:41
 "Everybody Up" (S. Kelly, J. Mackay) - 4:16
 "I Don't Want to Be with Nobody but You" (Eddie Floyd) - 4:47
 "Come Clean" (S. Kelly, G. Beers) - 4:12
 "The Water Is Wide" (Traditional) - 5:10 
 "Harmony" - 4:38
 "I Had a Premonition" - 4:23
 "Pomona's Place" - 3:01
 "Clemency" (S.Kelly, G. Beers) - 4:26
 "Here's Looking Up Your Address" (M. King) - 1:31
 "Thank You Goodnight" - 5:05
 "Hallelujah" (Choruses) - 3:39

Charts

Weekly charts

Year-end charts

Certification

Personnel

Musicians
Absent Friends
 Sean Kelly - guitar, keyboards, vocals  
 Wendy Matthews - vocals  
 Garry Beers - bass, vocals
 John Mackay - drums, percussion, synth.
 James Valentine - saxophone, clarinet, organ
 Michael King - guitar, vocals
 Nicole Ainslie - keyboards, organ, vocals
 Andrew Duffield - keyboards
More Friends
 Roger Mason - keyboards, synthesiser
 Peter Blakeley - vocals
 Jon Farriss - drums, percussion

Production
 Axolotl & Laz - Artwork  
 Nick Mainsbridge - Engineer  
 Sean Kelly - Producer 
 Garry Beers - Producer

References

1990 debut albums
Absent Friends (band) albums